Donnchad Muimnech Ó Cellaigh (died 1307) was King of Uí Maine and Chief of the Name.

Uí Maine during his reign fell away from subordinate status to the Kings of Connacht and regained something of its former independence, but at the cost of encastellation and settlement under Richard Mór de Burgh (died 1242) and his son, Walter de Burgh, 1st Earl of Ulster (died 1271).

1307. The greater number of the English of Roscommon were slain by Donough Muimhneach O'Kelly, Lord of Hy-Many, at Ath-easgrach-Cuan, where Philip Muinder, John Muinder, and Main Drew, with many others whose names are not mentioned, were killed. Dermot Gall Mac Dermot, Cormac Mac Kaherny, and the sheriff of Roscommon, were taken prisoners; but they were afterwards set at liberty, and they made peace recte restitution for the burning of the town by Edmund Butler. Donough O'Kelly, after he had performed these exploits, died; and his was not the death of one who had lived a life of cowardice, but the death of a man who had displayed prowess and bravery, and bestowed jewels and riches.

References

 The Tribes and customs of Hy-Many, John O'Donovan, 1843
 The Surnames of Ireland, Edward MacLysaght, Dublin, 1978.
 The Anglo-Normans in Co. Galway: the process of colonization, Patrick Holland, Journal of the Galway Archaeological and Historical Society, vol. 41,(1987–88)
 Excavation on the line of the medieval town defences of Loughrea, Co. Galway, J.G.A.& H.S., vol. 41, (1987–88)
 Anglo-Norman Galway; rectangular earthworks and moated sites, Patrick Holland, J.G.A. & H.S., vol. 46 (1993)
  Rindown Castle: a royal fortress in Co. Roscommon, Sheelagh Harbison, J.G.A. & H.S., vol. 47 (1995)
 The Anglo-Norman landscape in County Galway; land-holdings, castles and settlements, Patrick Holland, J.G.A.& H.S., vol. 49 (1997)
 Annals of Ulster at CELT: Corpus of Electronic Texts at University College Cork
 Annals of Tigernach at CELT: Corpus of Electronic Texts at University College Cork
Revised edition of McCarthy's synchronisms at Trinity College Dublin.

People from County Galway
People from County Roscommon
1307 deaths
14th-century Irish monarchs
Donnchad Muimnech
Year of birth unknown
Kings of Uí Maine